The following transit lines in Brooklyn, New York City, United States have been known as the Fort Hamilton Line:
Fort Hamilton Line (Second Avenue), no longer a route
Fort Hamilton Line (Third Avenue), no longer a route
Fort Hamilton Line (Fifth Avenue), now the B63 bus route

The BMT Fourth Avenue Line subway also runs to Fort Hamilton.